Jacob Fries may refer to:

 Jakob Friedrich Fries (1773–1843), German philosopher
 Jacob H. Fries (born 1978), American journalist